Rumbek University (or RU) is a university in South Sudan.

Location
The university's temporary campus is housed on the premises of Rumbek Secondary School, in the town of Rumbek (estimated population in 2008 was 32,100). The UNICEF compound in Rumbek is situated in Rumbek Central County, Lakes State in central South Sudan. The coordinates of the campus are: 6° 48' 0.00"N, 20° 41' 15.00"E (Latitude: 6.80000; Longitude: 29.68750). A permanent campus is under construction in Abinajok, a suburb of Rumbek.

History
The concept of establishing Rumbek University was adopted in February 2006 when the president of the Republic of Sudan Omer Al-Bashir visited Rumbek and pledged to build a university in the town. Subsequently the project was approved at the Sudanese federal level in Khartoum and at the regional level in Juba. The university was established in 2010 as a joint project between the federal government in Khartoum and the Southern Government in Juba. Following South Sudan's independence  in July 2011, the university is now the responsibility of the government of South Sudan.

Overview
Rumbek University opened its doors in 2010, with 500 students and 40 academic faculties. The university is a public university. Since the founding of the university, a fifth public university has been established. The list of public universities in the country includes the following:
 Juba National University in Juba; 1977
 Rumbek University in Rumbek; 2010
 Upper Nile University in Malakal; 1991
 University of Bahr El-Ghazal in Wau and
 University of Northern Bahr El-Ghazal in Aweil; 2011

Academic Colleges
The university maintains the following faculties:
 College of Education
 College of Economic and Social Studies
College  of Agriculture
College of Veterinary  medicine

See also
Rumbek
Lakes (state)
Bahr el Ghazal
Education in South Sudan
List of universities in South Sudan

References

External links
 Location of temporary campus of Rumbek University

Universities in South Sudan
Rumbek
Lakes (state)
Bahr el Ghazal
Educational institutions established in 2010
2010 establishments in South Sudan